Marsters is a variant of the more familiar Masters (surname).

It may refer to:

Bill Marsters, first president of the Cook Islands Christian Church
Charles E. Marsters, American lacrosse player and proponent
James Marsters, American actor and musician
James C. Marsters, American deaf orthodontist who helped invent the first teletypewriter
Nathaniel Marsters, farmer, magistrate and political figure in Nova Scotia
Tom Marsters, Cook Islands politician
William Marsters, English adventurer who settled on Palmerston Island, Cook Islands

See also 
Master (disambiguation)